Pimelea cornucopiae is a species of flowering plant in the family Thymelaeaceae and is native to north Queensland and some islands to the north of Australia, New Guinea and the Philippines. It is an erect shrub with egg-shaped leaves and clusters of white or creamy-white flowers.

Description
Flowering occurs from February to July.

Taxonomy
Pimelea cornucopiae  was first formally described in 1804 by Martin Vahl in his book Enumeratio Plantarum.

Distribution and habitat
This pimelea mainly grows in woodland or forest and occurs in near-coastal areas between the Torres Strait and Bundaberg in north Queensland, and in the Philippines, New Ireland, New Britain, New Guinea and the Louisiade Archipelago.

References

cornucopiae
Flora of Queensland
Malvales of Australia
Plants described in 1804
Taxa named by Martin Vahl